Prometric, also known as Prometric Testing, is a U.S.-based company in the test administration industry. Its corporate headquarters is located in Canton (Baltimore, Maryland) in the United States. Prometric operates a test center network composed of thousands of sites in 160 countries. Many examinations are administered at Prometric sites, including those from the India-Common Entrance Test, North American Veterinary Licensing Examination, and Secondary School Admission Test.

History
Prometric's computerized testing centers were founded by Drake International in 1990 under the name Drake Prometric. In 1995, Drake Prometric L.P. was sold to Sylvan Learning in a cash and stock deal worth approximately $44.5 million. The acquired business was renamed Sylvan Prometric, then sold to Thomson Corporation in 2000. The Thomson Corporation announced its desire to sell Prometric in the fall of 2006, and Educational Testing Service announced plans to acquire it. On Monday, October 15, 2007, Educational Testing Service (ETS) closed its acquisition of Prometric from the Thomson Corporation. Prometric co-sponsored the 10th Annual International Conference on Medical Regulation, which took place at the Ottawa Convention Centre in Ontario, Canada in October 2012.

In 2018, Prometric was bought by Baring Private Equity Asia. In September 2019, Roy Simrell joined Prometric as President and CEO.

In August 2022, Prometric acquired Finetune, an AI-assisted assessment and learning technology tool.

Business
Prometric sells a range of services, including test development, test delivery, and data management capabilities. Prometric delivers and administers tests to approximately 500 clients in the academic, professional, government, corporate and information technology markets. While there are 3,000 Prometric test centers across the world, including every U.S. state and territory (except Wake Island), whether a particular test can be taken outside the U.S. depends on the testing provider. For example, despite the fact that Prometric test centers exist worldwide, some exams are only offered in the country where the client program exists. The locations where a test is offered, as well as specific testing procedures for the day of the exam, are dictated by the client.

In the Republic of Ireland, Prometric's local subsidiary is responsible for administering the Driver Theory Test.

Challenges
Prometric has faced criticism by many test takers as a result of its lack of accountability and mismanagement. Many accuse the service of having monopoly power, since the test they desire to take is only offered through a Prometric center.

In 2009, the company faced a hurdle due to widespread technical problems on one of India's MBA entrance exams, the Common Admission Test. Over 8000 test takers were affected. In 2011, Prometric lost the contract for conducting the Oracle certification exam and they were replaced by Pearson VUE. In 2014, the IBM Professional Certification Program exam delivery was moved from Prometric to Pearson VUE Test Centers. In 2014, Prometric lost the bid for conducting it second time to an Indian tech firm. In 2014, a latency issue affected one Prometric-administered test, namely the AIPGMEE. In 2014, Microsoft ended its exam partnership with Prometric. In 2017, Prometric lost the contract for conducting the Medical College Admission Test (MCAT) exam. They were replaced with Pearson VUE. That same year, Charles Kernan was appointed as the new President and CEO of Prometric, replacing Michael Brannick. Brannick had held the position since 2001. In 2019, Project Management Institute (PMI) ended its exam partnership with Prometric. They were replaced with Pearson VUE. In 2020, as a result of COVID-19, Prometric cancelled exams including the United States Medical Licensing Examinations (USMLE) and the Comprehensive Osteopathic Medical Licensing Examination (COMLEX) in compliance with local and national regulations. On February 21, 2021, Prometric was found in a civil trial to have terminated a test evaluator in September 2018 as retaliation for his continued attempts to highlight a potential discrimination issue in one of their Washington Home Care Aide tests (poor translation of the Somali version). The reason for termination was found to be a pretext, and after some public exposure the company changed the test as the evaluator had recommended.

Successes
The COVID-19 pandemic massively changed the testing industry, and Prometric® rededicated itself to prioritizing remote assessments, accessibility, and security. During the pandemic, Prometric established clear safety guidelines to protect test takers and staff. Measures included regular disinfecting, social distancing, and increasing availability of remote exams. Prometric also partnered with epidemiologists at Johns Hopkins University to introduce new safety protocols to keep test takers and staff safe at in-person exams in test centers. As of May 1, 2022, Prometric announced that candidates and staff were no longer required to wear masks at in-person test centers unless required to do so by building management or local government mandates.

Prometric continued to build upon its remote assessment platform during and following the pandemic. The ProProctor™ platform is a proprietary remote testing solution that uses advanced AI technology along with live proctoring staff to create a multilayered security system. While other assessment companies rely on AI-only methods, the ProProctor™ platform uses AI to enhance human proctors, not replace them. This creates a secure, safe, and fair assessment environment for both test takers and credentialing organizations. In April 2022, Prometric’s ProProctor™ platform was named a finalist for the EdTech Cool Tool Award.

Prometric continues to expand ProProctor™ in key industries. In March 2022, Prometric announced a partnership with Saudi Commission for Health Specialists to provide remote practice exams through the ProProctor™ platform for candidates preparing for licensure exams. In April 2022, Prometric announced the Department of Healthcare Professions Ministry of Public Health in Qatar would use ProProctor™ for its dietician exam. Both partnerships increased flexibility and accessibility for test takers with critical healthcare exams.

In June 2022, Prometric appointed Nikki Eatchel, an industry veteran with more than 25 years of experience, as their Chief Assessment Officer to oversee test delivery and innovation across products. 

Prometric acquired Finetune, a leading innovator in AI-assisted assessment and learning technology, in August 2022. The acquisition will provide Prometric access to AI and machine learning tools to help create fair, valid, and equitable assessments more quickly. Finetune’s Generate tool alone will help develop test items, passages, and content up to ten times faster than traditional methods, creating a more secure and quality assessment. This is their second recent acquisition, following their acquisition of Paragon Testing Enterprises in April 2021. Paragon was Canada’s largest provider of English language proficiency tests. The partnership significantly increased access to Paragon tests, such as Canadian Academic English Language Test – Computer Edition, through Prometric’s vast testing network. In 2019, the CFA Institute® selected Prometric to complete its digital transformation of the Level I program exam to computer-based testing (CBT) beginning in 2021. This partnership allowed the CFA Institute to expand its offerings through CBT by using Prometric’s extensive global and integrated network of test development and delivery solutions.

Prometric currently has more than 14,000 testing locations in more than 180 countries. The company has served over 200 million candidates in its 30 years of operations with more than 1 billion testing hours. Prometric continues to develop its end-to-end delivery of assessments through hybrid, in-center, and remote options.

References

Companies based in Baltimore
Psychological testing
1990 establishments in Maryland
Education companies established in 1990
1995 mergers and acquisitions
2000 mergers and acquisitions
2007 mergers and acquisitions
2018 mergers and acquisitions